Rai Mansab Ali Khan is a Pakistani politician who was a Member of the Provincial Assembly of the Punjab, from 2002 to 2007 and again from May 2013 to May 2018.

Early life and education
He was born on 18 August 1948 in Multan.

He has a degree of Bachelor of Arts and a degree of Bachelor of Laws which he obtained in 1982 from Government Wilayat Hussain College in Multan.

Political career
He was elected to the Provincial Assembly of the Punjab as a candidate of Pakistan Peoples Party (PPP) from Constituency PP-202 (Multan-IX) in 2002 Pakistani general election. He received 27,260 votes and defeated a candidate of Pakistan Muslim League (N) (PML-N). From 2002 to 2007, he served as Parliamentary Secretary for Cooperatives.

He ran for the seat of the Provincial Assembly of the Punjab as a candidate of Pakistan Muslim League (Q) from Constituency PP-202 (Multan-IX) in 2008 Pakistani general election but was unsuccessful. He received 16,693 votes and lost the seat to a candidate of PPP.

He was re-elected to the Provincial Assembly of the Punjab as a candidate of PML-N from Constituency PP-202 (Multan-IX) in 2013 Pakistani general election.

References

Living people
Punjab MPAs 2013–2018
Punjab MPAs 2002–2007
1948 births
Pakistan Muslim League (N) politicians